César, duc de Choiseul, comte du Plessis-Praslin (1602 – 23 December 1675) was a Marshal of France and French diplomat, generally known for the best part of his life as the maréchal (marshal) du Plessis-Praslin.

He came of an old family of Choiseul, which arose in the valley of the Upper Marne in the 10th century and divided into many branches, three of the names of which, Hostel, Praslin and du Plessis, were borne, at one time or another, by César.  Entering the army at the age of fourteen as proprietary colonel of an infantry regiment, he shared in almost all the exploits of the French arms during the reign of Louis XIII. He took part in the siege of La Rochelle, survived the defence of the island of Re against the attacks of the English under the Duke of Buckingham, and accompanied the English forces to Italy in 1629.

In 1630 he became the French ambassador to the court of Duke Victor Amadeus I of Savoy, and engaged in diplomatic and administrative work in Italy until 1635, when the Franco-Spanish War broke out. In the war that followed, Plessis-Praslin distinguished himself in various battles and sieges in Italy, including the action called the "Route de Quiers" and the celebrated four-cornered operations round Turin. In 1640 he became governor of Turin, and in 1642 lieutenant-general, and after further service in Italy he became a Marshal of France (1645) and  second in command in Catalonia, where he took Roses.

During the first war of the Fronde (1648–1649), he assisted Condé in the brief siege of Paris (January 1649); and in the second war of the Fronde (1650–1653), remaining loyal to the queen regent Anne of Austria and the court party, he won his greatest triumph in defeating Turenne and the allied Spaniards and rebels at Retbel (or Blanc-Champ) in 1650.

He then held high office at the court of Louis XIV, became minister of state in 1652, and in November 1665 was created duc de Choiseul. He was concerned in some of the negotiations between Louis and Charles II of England which led to the treaty of Dover (1670), and died in Paris on 23 December 1675.

Notes

References
Attribution

Choiseul, Caesar, duc de
Choiseul, Caesar, duc de
Choiseul, Caesar, duc de
Choiseul, Ceasur, duc de
Choiseul, Caesar, duc de
People of the Fronde
Military personnel of the Franco-Spanish War (1635–1659)